Atlantic Star or Atlantic Starr may refer to:
Atlantic Star, a British & Commonwealth Second World War campaign medal
Atlantic Star (cruise ship)
Atlantic stargazer, a fish
Atlantic Starr, a ca. 1980 US R&B band
Atlantic Starr (album), the abovementioned band's first album, released in 1978

See also
Mid Atlantic Star Party